Paradise: Hope is a 2013 Austrian drama film directed by Ulrich Seidl, the third in his Paradise trilogy. The film premiered in competition at the 63rd Berlin International Film Festival. It was screened in the Contemporary World Cinema section at the 2013 Toronto International Film Festival.

Plot
While Melanie's mother spends her holidays in Kenya, a group of overweight teenagers goes to a diet camp in the Austrian mountains. Everyday life in the camp is marked by drills, rationed meals, and food counseling. At night, the girls discuss puberty problems, smoke cigarettes, and steal food from the kitchen. Melanie falls in love with her physician and director of the camp. The doctor is torn between the professional duty and his emotions, which become stronger against his will. At the end, he forces himself to prohibit further contact between him and Melanie, causing her deep distress.

Cast
 Melanie Lenz as Melanie
 Verena Lehbauer as Verena 
 Joseph Lorenz as the doctor
 Viviane Bartsch as the dietician

Reception 
In a positive review, Steven Boone noted "Seidl is fascinated with the little ways people decorate their lives to reflect the brighter future they are toiling for within a rigid system that both promises that future and continually denies it." He also pointed out that "Seidl's camera always stands back to let the women's environments and their orientation within them tell their stories in a way that can inspire compassionate recognition." In the New York Times, Stephen Holden observed that the movie "contemplates the tyranny of what is nowadays sometimes referred to as “body fascism” in a society that holds out nearly impossible ideals of beauty and youth."

References

External links
 
 Paradise: Hope at the Austrian Film Institute

2013 films
2013 drama films
Austrian drama films
Films directed by Ulrich Seidl
2010s German-language films
Juvenile sexuality in films
Films about puberty